Reserve Officers' Training Corps is a college-based program for training commissioned officers of the United States armed forces.

Reserve Officers' Training Corps may also refer to a similar program in other countries:

Reserve Officers' Training Corps (Philippines)
Reserve Officers' Training Corps (South Korea)
Reserve Officers' Training Corps (Taiwan)

Other uses
Air Force Reserve Officer Training Corps, the US Air Force component of the ROTC
Army Reserve Officers' Training Corps, the US Army component of the ROTC
Naval Reserve Officers Training Corps, the US Navy and US Marine Corps component of the ROTC
Junior Reserve Officers' Training Corps, an affiliate program in US high schools

See also
Officers' Training Corps, the British Army equivalent of Army ROTC
University Air Squadron, the Royal Air Force equivalent of Air Force ROTC
University Royal Naval Unit, the Royal Navy equivalent of Naval ROTC
Reserve Officer Training in Russia
Canadian Cadet Organizations